Christophe Di Pompeo (born 15 July 1964) is a French politician of La République En Marche! (LREM) who has been serving as a member of the French National Assembly since the 2017 elections, representing the department of Nord.

Political career
In parliament, Di Pompeo served on the Committee on Foreign Affairs. In addition to his committee assignments, he chaired the French-Italian Parliamentary Friendship Group.

In July 2019, Di Pompeo decided not to align with his parliamentary group's majority and became one of 52 LREM members who abstained from a vote on the French ratification of the European Union’s Comprehensive Economic and Trade Agreement (CETA) with Canada.

In September 2020, Di Pompeo publicly endorsed Christophe Castaner in an internal vote to succeed Gilles Le Gendre as chair of the LREM parliamentary group.

He lost his seat in the first round of the 2022 French legislative election.

See also
 2017 French legislative election

References

1964 births
Living people
Deputies of the 15th National Assembly of the French Fifth Republic
La République En Marche! politicians
People from Nord (French department)
Politicians from Hauts-de-France
French people of Italian descent